"Makin' Up for Lost Time (The Dallas Lovers' Song)" is a song recorded as a duet by American country music artists Crystal Gayle and Gary Morris.  The song was from the CBS TV series Dallas.  It was released in October 1985 as the first single from the album What If We Fall in Love?. The song was the most successful country hit for the duo of Crystal Gayle and Gary Morris.  The single went to number one for one week and spent a total of 14 weeks on the country chart.  Morris wrote the song with Dave Loggins.

Chart performance

References

1985 singles
Crystal Gayle songs
Gary Morris songs
Songs written by Dave Loggins
Male–female vocal duets
Song recordings produced by Jim Ed Norman
Warner Records singles
Songs from television series
1985 songs
Songs written by Gary Morris
Dallas (TV franchise)